Marko Blagojević (born 1976) is a politician and diplomat in Serbia. He served in the National Assembly of Serbia from 2016 to 2017 as a member of the Serbian Progressive Party parliamentary group, although he does not appear to have been a member of the party. In February 2017, he was appointed as Serbia's ambassador to Cyprus.

Early life and career
Blagojević is from Belgrade. He was secretary-general of Serbia's ministry of foreign affairs during Ivan Mrkić's tenure as minister.

Political career
Blagojević received the 106th position on the Progressive Party's Aleksandar Vučić – Serbia Is Winning electoral list in the 2016 parliamentary election and was elected when the coalition won a landslide victory with 131 out of 250 mandates. During his time in parliament, he was a member of the parliamentary committees on European integration, foreign affairs, and defence and internal affairs; a substitute member of the committee on Kosovo-Metohija; and a member of the parliamentary friendship groups for China, Cyprus, India, Norway, Switzerland, and the United Kingdom. He was also a deputy member of Serbia's delegation to the Parliamentary Assembly of the Council of Europe, where he sat with the European People's Party group.

Ambassador
Blagojević was appointed by President Tomislav Nikolić as Serbia's ambassador to Cyprus on February 22, 2017. He formally resigned from the assembly on April 19, 2017.

References

1976 births
Living people
Members of the National Assembly (Serbia)
Substitute Members of the Parliamentary Assembly of the Council of Europe
Politicians from Belgrade
European People's Party politicians